This is a list of notable people from Edmundston, New Brunswick. Although not everyone in this list was born in Edmundston, they all live or have lived in Edmundston and have had significant connections to the community.

See also
 List of people from New Brunswick

References

Edmundston
Edmundston